Events from the year 1702 in Ireland.

Incumbent
Monarch: William III (until 8 March), then Anne

Events
 8 March – Anne becomes Queen of England, Scotland and Ireland upon the death of William III.

Arts and literature
October – Jonathan Swift returns to Ireland in the company of Esther Johnson.

Births
January – Thomas Arthur, comte de Lally, French general, born at Romans, Dauphin, the son of Sir Gerald Lally, an Irish Jacobite from Tuam, County Galway, who married a French noblewoman (d. 1766)

Deaths
10 December – Michael Boyle (archbishop of Armagh) (Church of Ireland) (b. 1609?)

References

 
18th century in Ireland
Years of the 18th century in Ireland
Ireland
1700s in Ireland